The 2010 Australian Open was a tennis tournament that took place in Melbourne Park in Melbourne, Australia, from 18 to 31 January. It was the 98th edition of the Australian Open, and the first Grand Slam event of the year.

Seeds

Qualifiers

Qualifying draw

First qualifier

Second qualifier

Third qualifier

Fourth qualifier

Fifth qualifier

Sixth qualifier

Seventh qualifier

Eighth qualifier

Ninth qualifier

Tenth qualifier

Eleventh qualifier

Twelfth qualifier

References

External links
 2010 Australian Open – Women's draws and results at the International Tennis Federation

Women's Singles Qualifying
Australian Open (tennis) by year – Qualifying